Liliane Rudabet Gloria Elsveta "Leelee" Sobieski (born June 10, 1983) is an American artist and retired actress. She achieved fame in her teens with roles in films such as Deep Impact, Eyes Wide Shut, Joy Ride, Here on Earth, and The Glass House. She received Emmy Award and Golden Globe Award nominations for her portrayal of the title character in the television film Joan of Arc and a further Golden Globe nomination for her performance in the miniseries Uprising.

Sobieski continued to work in films and on television until retiring in 2012, after which she focused on her art career.

Early life 

Sobieski was born in New York City. Her mother, Elizabeth Sobieski (née Salomon), is an American film producer and screenwriter who also works as Sobieski's manager, and her father, Jean Sobieski, is a French-born painter and former actor of Polish and Swiss descent. Her maternal grandfather, United States Navy Captain Robert Salomon, was Jewish. Her maternal grandmother was of Ashkenazi Jewish and one quarter Dutch descent. Sobieski grew up in a "pan-religious" family; she has said that she is "proud of [her] melting pot roots". Her younger brother is Robert "Roby" Sobieski.

Sobieski's first name, Liliane, was the name of her paternal grandmother. One of her middle names, Elsveta, is derived from her mother's name, Elizabeth.

She graduated from Trevor Day School in 2001 and studied literature and fine art at Brown University but did not graduate.

Acting career 
Sobieski was first noticed by a talent scout in the cafeteria of a New York City private school. That encounter led to her audition for the role of Claudia in Interview with the Vampire (1994), a role that ultimately went to Kirsten Dunst. Sobieski portrayed the character of Anna Yates in the 1994 TV movie Reunion starring Marlo Thomas. Next, she played a lead role in A Horse for Danny, a 1995 made-for-television film. In 1997, she snagged her first role in a studio film playing the daughter of Martin Short's character in the Tim Allen comedy Jungle 2 Jungle. In 1999, Sobieski appeared in Stanley Kubrick's Eyes Wide Shut. Recalling acting alongside Tom Cruise, Sobieski stated he was "very kind and considerate with me," and says her most vivid recollection of Kubrick, who died soon after filming finished, was that he "genuinely seemed to hold something magic".

While still in her mid-teens, Sobieski rose to fame with her appearance in the movie Deep Impact (1998). The film was a major financial success, grossing over $349 million worldwide on a $75 million production budget. Deep Impact brought her to the attention of many casting directors. That same year Sobieski appeared in the Merchant Ivory film A Soldier's Daughter Never Cries. Sobieski's performance received praise from critics; Emanuel Levy of Variety wrote that "the graceful Sobieski registers strongly as a potential star, combining physical charm with technical skill." The film garnered her a Young Artist Award nomination, as well as a nomination by the Chicago Film Critics Association.

In 1999, Sobieski was cast in a supporting role in the teen comedy feature Never Been Kissed starring Drew Barrymore. Her next performance in the title role of the TV movie Joan of Arc (1999) earned her an Emmy nomination and a Golden Globe nomination, and she became the youngest actress ever to portray Joan of Arc on screen. In 2000, Sobieski played the female lead in the film Here on Earth, for which she received a Teen Choice Award nomination. She received a second Golden Globe nomination for her portrayal of Tosia Altman in the 2001 TV film Uprising.

In 2001, Sobieski played the lead role in the road horror film Joy Ride with Paul Walker and Steve Zahn. The film received generally favorable reviews. Garth Franklin of Dark Horizons stated that Sobieski "does a better job than usual." That same year, she starred in the thriller The Glass House, alongside Diane Lane. The film was panned by critics and, with little promotion, had a disappointing opening weekend gross of just under $6 million.  Sobieski's performance in the 2001 low-budget drama My First Mister was praised by critics, with Pete Croatto of Filmcritic.com writing that, "As for Sobieski, who I've always liked, she does another fine job. This time it's with a shaky character – the troubled Goth chick... [but] Sobieski finds her character's human touch and runs with it."

Sobieski landed a starring role in the independent film L'Idole (2002), which opened at the Toronto International Film Festival. She then starred alongside John Cusack in the drama feature Max, as the mistress of a Jewish art dealer who mentors a young Adolf Hitler. Next, she portrayed the character of Cecile in the miniseries Les Liaisons dangereuses (2003) with Catherine Deneuve and Rupert Everett, an adaptation of Laclos's classic novel of sexual intrigue which made use of Sobieski's fluency in French. She portrayed the role of Deianira in Hercules, a 2005 television miniseries.

The experimental-indie film Lying, starring Sobieski alongside Chloë Sevigny and Jena Malone, debuted at the 2006 Cannes Film Festival, followed by a limited release in the United States in 2008. She next starred in the American drama Heavens Fall as one of several young women who accuse nine black youths of rape in the segregated South. That same year, she appeared in the horror film In a Dark Place as well as the remake of The Wicker Man starring Nicolas Cage.

The independent comedy film Walk All over Me, in which Sobieski plays a woman who becomes a dominatrix, premiered at the 2007 Toronto International Film Festival and was later screened at several other film festivals. Her next major motion picture, the thriller 88 Minutes co-starring Al Pacino and Alicia Witt, opened on April 18, 2008, in the United States, after a release in various other countries the previous year. Though panned by critics, the film was a minor success at the box office, earning more than $32 million worldwide.

In January 2008, Sobieski appeared in In the Name of the King: A Dungeon Siege Tale, a fantasy film inspired by the Dungeon Siege video game series. For her performances in both 88 Minutes and A Dungeon Siege Tale, she received a Razzie Award nomination for Worst Supporting Actress. Sobieski next reteamed with her Joy Ride co-star Steve Zahn in the direct-to-video film Night Train. In the film, Sobieski plays Chloe, a potentially lethal medical student who has a fateful encounter with two other strangers aboard a Polar Express-like train.

In 2009, Sobieski had a small role in the biographical crime drama Public Enemies. In June 2010, she starred alongside Denise Richards and Jamie Kennedy in the film Finding Bliss, a romantic comedy about a straitlaced aspiring filmmaker who is forced to go to work for a producer of adult films. She made a guest appearance in the television series Drop Dead Diva in the episode "A Mother's Secret". Sobieski also played a lead role in the 2010 drama thriller Acts of Violence, the story of a man on a mission of vengeance after his wife is raped.

Sobieski joined the cast of the comedy-drama The Last Film Festival, co-starring Dennis Hopper, Jacqueline Bisset and Chris Kattan. Filmed in Queens in 2009, the movie was released theatrically in Los Angeles on September 30, 2016.

Sobieski guest-starred in a January 2011 episode of The Good Wife, playing the girlfriend of one of Lockhart-Gardner-Bond's most influential clients who is accused of using prescription stimulants. She starred in the CBS drama NYC 22 as a rookie New York City police officer, and landed the role of Abby Gibbons in the movie Branded, released in 2012.

Art career 
She began her art career using her married name Leelee Kimmel. She paints and sculpts abstract work, and works in VR, using Google Tilt Brush. She uses bright colors, abstracted and textured shapes floating on either a large black or white background.

Her 2018 solo exhibit debut, “Channels,” opened at the Journal Gallery in Williamsburg, Brooklyn, and garnered positive reviews. Vogue said the exhibit and her work "warrants serious merit". She then debuted her first UK exhibit titled “Wormhole” at the Simon Lee Gallery in London. In this latest installment, she presents large-scale abstract paintings that are confrontational in both colour and dimension, exploring themes of creation and destruction. “Kimmel’s world is very much her own – a heady mix of daftness and profundity – and a space that’s potentially fascinating, yet disorientating for those unfamiliar with it. Such are the worlds she builds in her paintings, too, and which expand beyond the canvas into gloriously gelatinous sculptures and a pioneering VR piece.” Interview Magazine says, "Leelee Kimmel has always been an artist."

Personal life

Family and relationships

In January 2009, Sobieski began dating fashion designer Adam John Kimmel, the son of American real estate developer Martin Kimmel and grandson of American boat racer and designer Donald Aronow. They were engaged on May 28, 2009, and it was made public on June 23, 2009, when fans at the premiere of Public Enemies spotted Sobieski wearing an engagement ring. The couple officially announced their engagement on July 17, 2009. Their daughter was born in December 2009 and their son was born in August 2014. They reside in Red Hook, Brooklyn.

Sobieski speaks fluent French, which she learned from her French-born father.

Interviews
Sobieski, in a 2001 interview with IGN, expressed her thoughts about whether the movies she was making were escapist fare, or that they had a deeper message for society,
Joy Ride isn't a film you would make a statement with. It's a fun, jump out of life film. That's great. I love those films. Those films are great in times like these too. You can make a point with a film and help society or not. Take a film like Bulworth, a fantastic film. There are certain films like that, that can appeal to everybody and have a message in it and that's really great.

In 2016, Sobieski confirmed "I don't do movie stuff anymore." Commenting on the reasons for her early retirement to Us Weekly, Sobieski said, "I am just focused on my kids. I think that's mainly why I stopped ... Also, ninety percent of acting roles involve so much sexual stuff with other people, and I don't want to do that."

Filmography

Film

Television

References

External links 

 
 
 

1983 births
Living people
20th-century American actresses
21st-century American actresses
Actresses from New York City
American child actresses
American film actresses
American people of Dutch descent
American people of French descent
American people of Polish descent
American television actresses
American women artists
American Ashkenazi Jews
Jewish American actresses
Brown University alumni
People from the Upper East Side
21st-century American Jews